Spencer Gordon Bennet (January 5, 1893 – October 8, 1987) was an American film producer and director. Known as the "King of Serial Directors", he directed more film serials than any other director.

Biography
Born in Brooklyn, New York, Bennet first entered show business as a stunt man, when he answered a newspaper ad to jump from the Palisades of the Hudson River while wearing a suit for the serial film Hurricane Hutch (1921). The gig at that time paid $1 per foot he had to fall.

He made his directorial debut in 1921's Behold the Man but made his serial directorial debut in 1925 with Sunken Silver. He would keep making serials, as well as B-Western features, until the very end of the genre, directing the last two serials made in the United States, Blazing the Overland Trail (1956) and Perils of the Wilderness (1956). After the serials ended he directed a handful of features, his final directorial credit being 1965's The Bounty Killer, which was also the final film to feature pioneering cowboy star Broncho Billy Anderson. When he died in 1987,he was buried at the Forest Lawn, Hollywood Hills Cemetery in Los Angeles, his tombstone was engraved "His Final Chapter".

Over his long career Bennet directed over 100 serials, including the Superman serials Superman and Atom Man vs. Superman both starring Kirk Alyn; The Masked Marvel; G-Men vs. the Black Dragon and Secret Service in Darkest Africa both starring Rod Cameron as agent Rex Bennett;  the second Batman serial Batman and Robin; The Purple Monster Strikes; the Adventures of Sir Galahad; The Tiger Woman; Captain Video: Master of the Stratosphere;  Zorro's Black Whip, and numerous western serials.

Among his "B" features were four for the Jungle Jim series starring Johnny Weissmuller and two for the Red Ryder series, featuring Wild Bill Elliott and Allan "Rocky" Lane.
He also directed eight episodes of the Ramar of the Jungle TV series.

Preservation
The Academy Film Archive preserved two of Spencer Gordon Bennet's films, Hawk of the Hills and Snowed In.

Partial filmography

 Sunken Silver (1925)
 The Green Archer (1925)
 The House Without a Key (1926)
 Marked Money (1928)
 Queen of the Northwoods (1929)
 Rogue of the Rio Grande (1930)
 The Last Frontier (1932)
 Badge of Honor (1934)
 Rescue Squad (1935)
 Western Courage (1935)
 Ranger Courage (1936)
 Rio Grande Ranger (1936)
 The Fugitive Sheriff (1936)
 The Unknown Ranger (1936)
 The Mysterious Pilot (1937)
 Oklahoma Terror (1939)
 The Secret Code (1942)
 The Valley of Vanishing Men (1942)
 G-Men vs. the Black Dragon (1943)
 Secret Service in Darkest Africa (1943)
 The Masked Marvel (1943)
 Canyon City (1943)
 The Tiger Woman (1944)
 Haunted Harbor (1944)
 Zorro's Black Whip (1944)
 Manhunt on Mystery Island (1945)
 Federal Operator 99 (1945)
 The Purple Monster Strikes (1945)
 The Phantom Rider (1946)
 King of the Forest Rangers (1946)
 Daughter of Don Q (1946)
 Son of Zorro (1947)
 The Black Widow (1947)
 Brick Bradford (1947)
 Superman (1948)
 Congo Bill (1948)
 Bruce Gentry – Daredevil of the Skies (1948)
 Batman and Robin (1949)
 Adventures of Sir Galahad (1949)
 Cody of the Pony Express (1950)
 Atom Man vs. Superman (1950)
 Pirates of the High Seas (1950)
 Roar of the Iron Horse (1951)
 Mysterious Island (1951)
 King of the Congo (1952)
 Brave Warrior (1952)
 The Miraculous Blackhawk: Freedom's Champion (1952)
 Son of Geronimo (1952)
 Voodoo Tiger (1952)
 The Lost Planet (1953)
 Killer Ape (1953)
 Gunfighters of the Northwest (1954)
 Riding with Buffalo Bill (1954)
 Adventures of Captain Africa Mighty Jungle Avenger! (1955)
 Devil Goddess (1955)
 Perils of the Wilderness (1956)
 Blazing the Overland Trail (1956)
 The Atomic Submarine (1959)

References

External links

 
 

1893 births
1987 deaths
Film producers from New York (state)
Film serial crew
People from Brooklyn
Burials at Forest Lawn Memorial Park (Hollywood Hills)
Film directors from New York City